Olympia Regional Airport  is a public use airport located four nautical miles (7 km) south of the central business district of Olympia, a city in Thurston County and the capital of the U.S. state of Washington. It is owned by the Port of Olympia. It is about one mile (1.6 km) east of Interstate 5, actually within the boundaries of the city of Tumwater which is south of and adjacent to Olympia. The airport was identified in the Washington State Department of Transportation Long Term Aviation Study as a field that could potentially serve to relieve Seattle-Tacoma International Airport of increasing congestion.

Olympic Flight Museum is located at the Olympia Airport, and Airlift Northwest, the region's air medical transport service uses the airport as one of its medical helicopter bases; a large private-use heliport, known as Olympia Heliport  is located on airport grounds. The flight museum and the airport play host to a moderate sized air show each June.

The airport's industrial park,  in extent, includes a U.S. Department of Commerce designated Free Trade Zone.

History 
The airport served as a satellite of nearby McChord Field during World War II, and commercial aviation history at the Olympia Airport extends to the 1920s. The airport now supports large business jets, cargo aircraft, military helicopters and has a backup runway lighting system for uninterrupted operations. Olympia Airport also has an ILS (Instrument Landing System) and backup power system for operations during bad weather or low visibility.  The Olympia VOR, located on the field, also provides Instrument Approaches into the Olympia Airport in low visibility conditions.

The FAA funded a $15 million improvement project that was completed in September, 2008. The work focused on runway line-of-sight improvements and enhanced taxiway and runway signage. In the late 1990s, the airport's runway protection zone was extended with the purchase of $5.5 million worth of land on each end of the primary runway, and an above ground fuel facility was constructed.

Facilities and aircraft 
It has two asphalt paved runways: 17/35 is 5,500 by 150 feet with precision markings (1,676 x 46 m) and runway 8/26 is 4,157 by 150 feet with basic markings (1,267 x 46 m). The airport has a passenger terminal, an air traffic control tower and a full-instrument landing approach system.

The field is home to fixed wing and helicopter flight instruction, major aircraft and oxygen maintenance facilities, the Washington State Patrol aviation division, and a key navigational aid (Olympia VOR) that is used by commercial flights inbound to Seattle-area airports, including Seattle-Tacoma International Airport, as well as use by general aviation aircraft in the region.

Cargo Carriers

See also

 Washington World War II Army Airfields

References

External links
 Olympia Regional Airport at Port of Olympia web site
 
 

Airports in Washington (state)
Airport
Transportation buildings and structures in Thurston County, Washington
Airfields of the United States Army Air Forces in Washington (state)